Edward Czernik (born 25 September 1940) is a Polish athlete. He competed in the men's high jump at the 1964 Summer Olympics.

References

External links
 

1940 births
Living people
Athletes (track and field) at the 1964 Summer Olympics
Polish male high jumpers
Olympic athletes of Poland
People from Lviv Oblast
Ukrainian Soviet Socialist Republic people
Universiade silver medalists for Poland
Universiade medalists in athletics (track and field)
Medalists at the 1965 Summer Universiade